Antonio Pimentel Tlahuitoltzin was  tlatoani (ruler) of Texcoco from 1540 to 1545.

His rule began in 1540 after the execution of his half brother and rival for the throne Carlos by the Spanish Inquisition. Unlike Carlos, Antonio was outwardly a Christian with a close relationship with the cleric Toribio de Benavente Motolinia. He successfully maintained his authority under the threat of Spanish imperialism adapting the pre-colonial state to the new situation. He died of disease five years into his reign and nominated Hernando as his successor.

References

Tlatoque